The Ligier JS41 was a Formula One car designed by Frank Dernie for use by the Ligier team in the 1995 Formula One World Championship. The car was powered by the 3-litre Mugen-Honda MF-301 V10 engine. The number 26 car was driven by Frenchman Olivier Panis while, at the insistence of Mugen, the number 25 car was shared between Englishman Martin Brundle and Japan's Aguri Suzuki. Another Frenchman, Franck Lagorce, served as the team's test driver. The team's main sponsor was Gitanes.

Design-wise, the JS41 bore a striking resemblance to the Benetton B195. At the start of 1995, Ligier was part-owned by Benetton's director, Flavio Briatore. Briatore transferred the Renault engines Ligier had used for the previous three years to Benetton, in turn convincing Mugen to supply Ligier instead of Minardi. During the season, Briatore sold his shares in Ligier to Tom Walkinshaw, Benetton's engineering director. As a result, the JS41 was one of the most competitive Ligiers in years which allowed Brundle and Panis to regularly fight for points in races.

Complete Formula One results
(key)

References

1995 Formula One season cars
Ligier Formula One cars